NASA Headquarters, officially known as Mary W. Jackson NASA Headquarters or NASA HQ and formerly named Two Independence Square, is a low-rise office building in the two-building Independence Square complex at 300 E Street SW in Washington, D.C. The building houses NASA leadership who provide overall guidance and direction to the US government executive branch agency NASA, under the leadership of the NASA administrator. Ten field centers and a variety of installations around the country conduct the day-to-day work.

NASA Headquarters is organized into four Mission Directorates: Aeronautics, Exploration Systems, Science, and Space Operations.

The James E. Webb Memorial Auditorium, named for NASA's second administrator James E. Webb, hosts agency news conferences and NASA Social events.
A lending library, the history office, archives, production facilities for NASA TV, and a NASA gift shop are also housed in the building.

The building, which opened in 1992, was designed by Kohn Pedersen Fox, with George How as the senior designer. It is currently owned by South Korean investment firm Hana Asset Management and leased to NASA through 2028.

On June 12, 2019, the street in front of the building was renamed Hidden Figures Way in honor of some of NASA's black women mathematicians, Katherine Johnson, Dorothy Vaughan, and Mary Jackson, who were the central characters in the 2016 film Hidden Figures. On June 24, 2020, NASA Administrator Jim Bridenstine announced that the agency’s headquarters building in Washington, D.C. had been renamed to Mary W. Jackson NASA Headquarters, after NASA's first black woman engineer, Mary W. Jackson. On February 26, 2021 a ceremony was held officially renaming the building.

References

External links

 Google Street View of building
 NASA’s Mission
 NASA headquarters library
 NASA History Program Office

Buildings of the United States government in Washington, D.C.
Office buildings in Washington, D.C.
NASA facilities
Southwest Federal Center
Name changes due to the George Floyd protests